"If I Die Tomorrow" is a song by the American heavy metal band Mötley Crüe released on their 2005 compilation album Red, White & Crüe. The song was one of the new songs recorded by Mötley Crüe for the album and the single charted at number 4 on the Mainstream rock charts. It is the first single since "Beauty" to feature drummer Tommy Lee.

Composition
Originally written by the Canadian pop punk band Simple Plan, "If I Die Tomorrow" was left off their 2004 album Still Not Getting Any... as the band did not feel that it fit in with the rest of the album. After finishing work with Simple Plan, producer Bob Rock brought the song to Mötley Crüe knowing that they were looking to record new material to include on their new compilation album. After hearing the song, Mötley Crüe bassist Nikki Sixx made several lyrical and music changes to it before the band recorded it.

Music video
A video was made to promote the single, which featured each one of the band members, which includes Sixx, vocalist Vince Neil, drummer Tommy Lee and guitarist Mick Mars each individually in a nightmarish scene from their past. Sixx's scene shows him overdosing on heroin; Neil's scene shows him accidentally killing his friend, Razzle from Hanoi Rocks; Mars' scene shows him in a hospital bed, battling Ankylosing spondylitis; and Lee's scene shows him in prison.  Also starred actress April Scott.

Personnel
 Vince Neil - vocals
 Mick Mars - guitar
 Nikki Sixx - bass
 Tommy Lee - drums

Charts

Florida Georgia Line cover
In 2014, Florida Georgia Line released a cover of "If I Die Tomorrow". The song appeared on a tribute album to Mötley Crüe, Nashville Outlaws: A Tribute to Mötley Crüe (2014). Florida Georgia Line version charted on the Hot Country Songs (#33).

References

2005 singles
Mötley Crüe songs
Songs written by Nikki Sixx
Song recordings produced by Bob Rock
Alternative metal songs